Seminara is an Italian surname. Notable people with the surname include:

Davide Seminara (born 1998), Italian footballer
Frank Seminara (born 1967), American baseball player

Italian-language surnames